Abraham Fernández (born 1 June 1967) is a Spanish former alpine skier who competed in the 1992 Winter Olympics.

References

1967 births
Living people
Spanish male alpine skiers
Olympic alpine skiers of Spain
Alpine skiers at the 1992 Winter Olympics
20th-century Spanish people